Ober-Laudenbach is a district of the town of Heppenheim in the state of Hesse, Germany. Formerly an independent municipality, it was merged into Heppenheim in 1971.

History 
Archaeological finds (burial mounds) show that Ober-Laudenbach was already a settlement 4000 years ago. Laudenbach was first documented in 795, referred to as Lutenbach. Around 1200, it became the principal town of Ober-Laudenbach.

References

Former municipalities in Hesse
Odenwald